The End of Eternity is a 1987 Soviet science fiction film directed by Andrei Yermash based on the eponymous 1955 novel by Isaac Asimov.

Plot
The film tells about the activities of a secret organization called Eternity which exists outside of time and controls everything on Earth. Representatives of Eternity can get into any century of the Earth's history, beginning with the 27th, the century when Eternity appeared, with the help of Time Capsules moving in the endlessly continuing Sockets of Time, and change the course of events as they themselves deem necessary — eradicating wars, customs, new weapons, space travel. Eternity recruits their new members from the population of normal "time people", taking them in childhood. They are forbidden to maintain any connection with their home, with their native Century. After training, they become Eternal — Observers, Computers, Sociologists, Technicians ... In this way Andrew Harlan comes to arrive in Eternity, who after training worked as an Observer in the 48th century. The young talented Observer is brought by the chairman of the Council of Time Senior Computer Laban Twisel to his home and makes him his personal Technician — a man who chooses the way to change reality that the almighty Computers have decided to change. He is going to entrust Andrew with a responsible assignment, during which Harlan should train a student named Cooper with knowledge of the Primitive History (that is, the history of the Earth before the Eternity), which Harlan has been fascinated with since childhood.

Mistakenly, Technician Harlan introduces Cooper to the Time Capsule device, which is strictly forbidden, for which he receives the punishment of being appointed Observer to the Eternity sector of the 48th century where his nemesis, Computer Finge, is in charge. There he meets a regular girl from the 48th century, Noÿs Lambent, who temporarily works for Finge as a secretary (this is extremely surprising for Harlan, since there are no women in Eternity). The love of Eternal and Mortal violates all plans of the Computer Twissell, who planned to close the circle of Time — to send Cooper's student in the 24th century, where he should, under the name of the great scientist Vikkor Mullanson (whom Eternity considered its founder) to open the temporal field and create the first devices that allow one to travel in Time which will create Eternity in the 27th century. This plan matured in Twissell due to the fact that he found in the archives of Eternity the so-called "memoir of Mullanson", where he describes his training in Eternity and sending it to the reality of the 24th century, and mentions the names of Twissel and Harlan.

When Computer Finge decides to change the reality of the 48th century, where Noÿs comes from, Harlan asks the familiar Sociologist Voy to compute whether she is in a new reality. Learning that she is not there, he hides Noÿs in the Hidden Centuries, located after the 1000th, from which there is no way out of the Eternity sectors into the Reality. When the change occurs, Harlan can not get to his beloved — Time Capsule stops in the 1000th century.

Henceforth, Andrew Harlan, Eternal to the bone, becomes an irreconcilable enemy of the Eternity and is ready to do anything to return his beloved girl, even destroy Eternity itself.

Cast
Oleg Vavilov — Andrew Harlan
Gediminas Girdvainis — Cooper
Georgiy Zhzhonov — Senior Calculator Laban Twissell
Vera Sotnikova — Noÿs Lambent
Boris Ivanov — Sennor Calculator
Boris Klyuyev — Sociologist Voy
Mikk Mikiver — Mentor (Rector of the School of Eternity) Yarrow
Sergei Yursky — Computer Hobbe Finge
Vladimir Fyodorov — dwarf

Production
The filming of one of the scenes (the place where Harlan arrives in the 20th century) took place in the same location as where the 1979 film Stalker was shot — in Estonia, 25 kilometers from Tallinn, on the Jägala River in the area of a destroyed power station.

References

External links
 

Soviet science fiction films
1980s science fiction films
Mosfilm films
Films based on works by Isaac Asimov
1980s Russian-language films
1987 films
Films based on American novels
Films based on science fiction novels
Films scored by Eduard Artemyev